Crazy Balloon is an arcade game released by Taito in 1980. Crazy Balloon requires the player to maneuver a balloon through a maze full of thorns in order to reach the goal.

Gameplay
The player controls a box tied to a floating balloon, which swings left and right continually, within a maze filled with spikes. Any contact with the spikes, either with the balloon or the box, destroys the balloon. Using a four-way joystick, the player moves the box through the maze and toward the goal, ensuring that the swinging balloon avoids the spikes.

The player collects points as the box moves closer to the goal (backtracking earns no points). Certain areas of the maze are colored green and purple, and the player will earn more points if the balloon and box pass through the area safely. While there is no time limit, the player cannot wait for a long time; otherwise, a face will appear and blow the balloon into the spikes.

As the player completes mazes, individual spikes, or even the entire maze, may begin moving or scrolling.

Music
Crazy Balloon sports relatively basic sound effects. The speaker beeps whenever the balloon gets closer to the goal. When the player starts a new maze, a portion of the melody from "Oh! Susanna" is played. Similarly, when the player loses a balloon, a portion of the chorus from the "Toreador Song" from the opera Carmen is played.

Legacy
The original arcade version has been included in emulated compilations such as Taito Legends 2 (PlayStation 2, Xbox and Microsoft Windows) and Taito Legends Power-Up (PlayStation Portable) in 2006. An updated version of the game, named Crazy Balloon 2005, was included alongside the original arcade release on Taito Legends Power-Up.

There were no official contemporary home ports, but there were clones, including Crazy Balloon for the Commodore 64 (Software Projects, 1983) and Crazy Balloons for the ZX Spectrum (A&F Software, 1983). A version for the BBC Micro was developed by Acornsoft but was never released.

References

External links
 
Taito Legends Power-Up US home page

1980 video games
Arcade video games
Commodore 64 games
NEC PC-6001 games
NEC PC-8001 games
PlayStation 2 games
PlayStation Portable games
Windows games
Xbox games
ZX Spectrum games
Cancelled BBC Micro and Acorn Electron games
Taito arcade games
Video games developed in Japan
Multiplayer and single-player video games